River Churni is a stream in the Nadia district of the Indian state of West Bengal. It is a distributary of the Mathabhanga River, itself a distributary of the Padma River at Munshiganj in the Kushtia District of
Bangladesh. The Mathabanga divides into two rivers, the Ichamati and the Churni near Majhdia in Nadia district.

Course
The Churni flows through Shibnivas, Hanskhali, Birnagar, Aranghata, and Ranaghat, and finally joins River Bhagirathi at Shivpur, Nadia near Chakdaha. Its length is almost . The river's origin is at 23.40 North, 88.70 East and its confluence is at 23.13 North, 88.50 East.

History
According to an article in the International Journal of Current Research, the river is in part the remnants of an artificial canal ordered dug by a 17th-century maharajah (king). Changes to a nearby distributary of the Jalangi River resulted partly from water diversion down the canal. Sedimentation eventually dried up the upper part of the distributary, called the Anjana, while the canal and the lower Anjana formed the Churni. Another name for the Churni is Kata Kal or "dug river". 

As recently as the 1930s, the river was an important route for water travel and trade. However, in the 21st century it has partly filled with silt, including many small islands, visible or submerged, and is no longer navigable.

References 

Churni
Rivers of India